During the 1999–2000 English football season, Sheffield United competed in the English First Division.

Season summary
Steve Bruce resigned from his post as Sheffield United manager after just one season in charge, mentioning chaos in the club's boardroom meetings and a lack of transfer funds. Adrian Heath replaced him as boss but resigned after six months and long-time Sheffield United supporter Neil Warnock took over the reins and prevented a threat of relegation, securing a 16th-place finish. During the season, striker Lee Morris was sold to Derby County for a club-record transfer of £3m.

Final league table

Results
Sheffield United's score comes first

Legend

Football League First Division

FA Cup

League Cup

Players

First-team squad
Squad at end of season

Left club during season

References

Notes

Sheffield United F.C. seasons
Sheffield United F.C.